La raza cósmica (The Cosmic Race) is a Spanish-language book written and published in 1925 by Mexican philosopher, secretary of education, and 1929 presidential candidate José Vasconcelos to express the ideology of a future "fifth race" in the Americas; an agglomeration of all the races in the world with no respect to color or number to erect a new civilization: Universópolis.

Claiming that social Darwinist and racialist ideologies are only created to validate, explain, and justify ethnic superiority and to repress others, Vasconcelos attempts to refute these theories and goes on to recognize his words as being an ideological effort to improve the cultural morale of a "depressed race" by offering his optimistic theory of the future development of a cosmic race.

As he explains in his literary work, armies of people would then go forth around the world professing their knowledge. Vasconcelos continues to say that the people of the Iberian regions of the Americas (that is to say, the parts of the continent colonised by Portugal and Spain) have the territorial, racial, and spiritual factors necessary to initiate the "universal era of humanity".

Critiques 
The ideas put forth in La raza cósmica are held to be rather controversial. For example, Celarent notes that many felt that the work and its author were exceedingly racist, such as when Vasconcelos' wrote “the Chinese, who under the holy counsel of Confucian morals multiply like rats."(p1000)(p19) However, when it was first written, Vasconcelos' piece was to be a reaction or refutation of Social Darwinism and biological racism although Juárez suggests that Vasconcelos' may have added to Mexican Conservative thought by doing so.(p51)

In order to refute the ideas of racial superiority Vasconcelos conceptualized a fifth race, the cosmic race, something that is an agglomeration of all of the other races. As Palacios notes, this race is called cosmic as it suggests that humanity will become combined and reach its destiny as inferior traits are lost through synthesis and a new Spiritual Era is reached.(p420) Juárez offers a critique to this concept against biological racism by suggesting that Vasconcelos reduced non-white races in order to uphold "Anglo-Saxon propaganda" and "Nordic educational, social and governmental systems."(p70)

Another critique is offered by Palacios on the basis that while Vasconcelos did not support so-called "negative eugenics" or Social Darwinism, he did advocate for a "eugenics  of  aesthetics." Palacios describes eugenics of aesthetics as a survival of the beautiful, as compared to Darwin's survival of the fittest.(p422) Palacios suggests that this viewpoint alongside other comments made by Vasconcelos show that he held some races as better than others.(p422)

Usage of phrase
The title  embodies the notion that traditional, exclusive concepts of so-called "race" and nationality can be transcended in the name of humanity's common destiny. It originally referred to a movement by Mexican intellectuals during the 1920s who pointed out that so-called "Latin" Americans have the blood of all the world's so-called "races": European, Asian-descended native Americans, and Africans, thereby transcending the peoples of the "Old World".

Vasconcelos also alluded to the term when he coined the National Autonomous University of Mexico's motto: "" ('Through my race the spirit will speak').

Contemporary usage 
Contemporarily La raza cósmica has become about mestizaje (racial mixture) and mestizos/Métis rather than the creation of the cosmic race. Palacios describes how the Chicano movement appropriated and transformed the ideas of Vasconcelos' fifth race into that of Mexican national thought, focusing on the words from a poem by Alurista, "a bronze people [an ethnic alloy] with a bronze culture [an alloy of traditions]."(p428) Palacios also gives the example of Valdez, a Chicano writer, who focused on trying to create a society that was less Eurocentric or Western rather than following Vasconcelos' idea to evolve the Indigenous and mixed into something better.(p430)

Mestizaje as the contemporary notion of cosmic race is shown in The Land of the Cosmic Race by Christina A. Sue. King and Moras give an overview of this piece and claim that Mexico has been re-founded on 3 pillars: mestizaje, non-racism, and non-blackness.(p249)(p956) They claim mestizaje is the new cultural identity of Mexico; non-racism is applied through this fact, as a place can't be racist if everyone is a mestizo (mixed race); and non-blackness is the removal of blackness from the culture, as a race category, and from the make-up of mestizos.(249) Both King and Moras note that Sue suggests that the removal of blackness allows the population focus on uplifting their Mexican identity, which she claims has more basis in whiteness.(249-50)(p457)

See also
Race and ethnicity in Latin America
Race of the Future
Racial democracy
Postracialism
Chicano
Mixed Race Day
Hispanic
Latin America
La Raza

References

External links 
 La Raza Cósmica Misión de la raza iberoamericana Notas de viajes a la América del Sur – Agencia Mundial de Librería, Madrid 1925 (Spanish)

1925 non-fiction books
Spanish-language works
Latin American culture
Politics and race
Multiracial affairs in the Americas
Books about race and ethnicity
Race (human categorization)

de:Kosmische Rasse